David E. Colclough (4 March 1964 – 18 October 2016) was a Welsh professional poker player.

Early life
Colclough was born in Carmarthen. Prior to becoming a poker professional, he worked in computing. He left computing after the 2000 World Series of Poker.

Poker career

His tournament results include a second at the 2000 World Series of Poker $2,000 [[Worldpokertour.com: Dave Colclough </ref> In 2005, he reached the semi-finals of the World Heads-Up Poker Championship, earning €20,000. In 2003, he was voted European Poker Player of the Year.

His total live poker tournament winnings exceeded $2,600,000.

Death
He returned from the Philippines to England in 2016 to seek medical care. He died on 18 October 2016, aged 52, suffering from HIV and cancer.

References

External links
Official site

1964 births
2016 deaths
Welsh poker players
British gambling writers
British computer specialists